Nop Bayyareth (born 16 June 1981) is Cambodian singer and actor. He records for Rasmey Hang Meas, one of the leading music companies in Cambodia.

Discography

Main albums
1999: Chea Thommada
2000: Kakey Chhnam 2000
2000: Pel Oun Nhonhem
2001: Pruoy Nek Mchas Snae
2004: Khum Chet
2006: Neak Srae Trov Chher Neak Srae Doch Knea
2011: Just Love I
2011: Just Love II
2012: Sangsa Lengleng, "Chun Por Kluon Aeng Aoy Chhab Plech Ke"

Live performances
Best of the Best: Live Concert is a concert performed annually
Hang Meas Music Top Show: Live Concert
The Voice Cambodia Tour Concert 2014
Cambodian's Idol Tour Concert 2015

TV Show
 Coach for "The Voice Cambodia Season 1" 2014 with his co-worker Aok Sokunkanha, Chhorn Sovannareach, and Pich Sophea
 Judge of "Cambodian's Idol Season 1" 2015 with his co-worker at Hang Meas Production Preap Sovath, Aok Sokunkanha, and Chhorn Sovannareach
 Coach for "The Voice Cambodia Season 2" 2016 with his co-worker Aok Sokunkanha, Chhorn Sovannareach, and Pich Sophea
 Judge of "Cambodian's Idol Season 2" 2016 with his co-worker at Hang Meas Production Preap Sovath, Aok Sokunkanha, and Chhorn Sovannareach
 Judge of "Cambodian's Idol Season 3" 2017 with his co-worker at Hang Meas Production Preap Sovath, Aok Sokunkanha, and Chhorn Sovannareach
Judge of "X factor Cambodia Season 1" 2019 with her co-worker at Hang Meas Production Aok Sokunkanha, Khemarak Sereymum, and Sok Seylalin

Films
 អាត់បី
 ភូមិគ្រិះចម្លែក
 ម៉េចដែរខ្លាចអត់? (2014)
រាជិនីភូមិគ្រឹះ (2019)

References

21st-century Cambodian male singers
Living people
1981 births